Liberty Baptist Church may refer to:

Liberty Baptist Church (Grooverville, Georgia), listed on the National Register of Historic Places in Brooks County, Georgia
Liberty Baptist Church (Evansville, Indiana), listed on the National Register of Historic Places in Vanderburgh County, Indiana
Liberty Baptist Church (Kief, North Dakota), listed on the National Register of Historic Places in McHenry County, North Dakota